Jolanda de Rover (born 10 October 1963) is a female former backstroke swimmer from the Netherlands.

Swimming career
Jolanda de Rover competed at the 1980, 1984 and 1988 Summer Olympics and won a gold and a bronze medal in backstroke in 1984. In 1988, she finished fifth and seventh in the 4 × 100 m medley relay and 200 m backstroke events, respectively. Between 1981 and 1986 she won four medals at European and world championships; she also won at least three national titles and set at least 10 national records in backstroke events. Despite being of Dutch nationality she won the ASA National British Championships 200 metres backstroke title twice in 1981 and 1988.

Personal life
De Rover was born in Amstelveen. She is the mother of Kira Toussaint, who qualified for the 2016 Summer Olympics in Rio de Janeiro in the 100 meter backstroke.

References

1963 births
Living people
Dutch female backstroke swimmers
Olympic swimmers of the Netherlands
Swimmers at the 1980 Summer Olympics
Swimmers at the 1984 Summer Olympics
Swimmers at the 1988 Summer Olympics
Medalists at the 1984 Summer Olympics
Olympic gold medalists for the Netherlands
Olympic bronze medalists for the Netherlands
Sportspeople from Amstelveen
Olympic bronze medalists in swimming
World Aquatics Championships medalists in swimming
European Aquatics Championships medalists in swimming
Olympic gold medalists in swimming
Universiade medalists in swimming
Universiade gold medalists for the Netherlands
Universiade silver medalists for the Netherlands
Universiade bronze medalists for the Netherlands
Medalists at the 1985 Summer Universiade
Medalists at the 1987 Summer Universiade
20th-century Dutch women
20th-century Dutch people
21st-century Dutch women